Daniel Webster High School is a high school in Tulsa, Oklahoma.  It is part of the Tulsa Public Schools, and is a public school for students from grades 9 through 12.  The school opened in 1938 in the West Tulsa section of the city, and is housed in a PWA-style Art Deco building designed by architects Arthur M. Atkinson, John Duncan Forsyth, Raymond Kerr, and William H. Wolaver.

In 2021, Daniel Webster High School was placed on the National Historic Registry as a Historical District: OKLAHOMA, TULSA COUNTY, Daniel Webster High School Historic District, 1919 West 40th St.,Tulsa, SG100006632, LISTED, 6/10/2021. Oklahoma's National Register of Historic Places' link: http://nr2_shpo.okstate.edu/QueryResult.aspx?id=SG100006632

In 2009, the school established a broadcasting and digital media magnet school program.

Facility description
The main building is two stories high plus a full basement. It contains 15 classrooms, a library, 2 cafeterias, a lecture room, a corrective gymnasium, a girls’ gymnasium, a 400-seat auditorium, a domestic-science department, 2 manual training rooms, 3 laboratories, offices, and dressing rooms. An adjacent building contains shops, the boys' gymnasium, and lockers. Both buildings are made of fireproof construction with exterior walls of brick and trimmed with stone.

Notable alumni
John H. Admire - Admire was commissioned in the United States Marine Corps as a second lieutenant after graduation from University of Oklahoma in 1967. He served in Vietnam and during Operation Desert Shield/Desert Storm. His staff assignments include Marine detachment, Guantanamo Bay Naval Base, Cuba; Training Officer for the 1st Marine Division; Marine Corps Legislative Liaison to the United States Congress; Headquarters Marine Corps, Washington, D.C.; Senior White House Military Aide for President Jimmy Carter; branch chief for the Operations Directorate at the United States European Command Headquarters in Germany; and Vice Director for Strategic Plans and Policy Joint Staff at the Pentagon, in Washington, D.C.[2] Author: Darker Than Dark, a story of the Vietnam War and four young Marines, 2015.
Bob Ballinger - member of the Arkansas House of Representatives from Berryville, Arkansas
Chris Benge - Speaker of the Oklahoma House of Representatives
Bill Borders - former Olympian wrestler and Attorney from Tulsa, Oklahoma
Dick Calmus - former major league baseball pitcher
Jeannie Richardson Cue - Class of 1972, Tulsa City Counsilor, District 2
Carl Morton - former major league baseball pitcher
Patti Page - singer, 2013 recipient of Grammy Lifetime Achievement Award
Loretta F. Radford (Class of 1975) Radford has worked in the U.S. Attorney’s Office for the Northern District of Oklahoma since 1995. She has served in various capacities since starting there. Most recently, she served as the interim U.S. Attorney during a transitionary period in 2017. From 2012 to March 2017, she served as the First Assistant U.S. Attorney.
Howard Rutledge (Class of 1946) - Vietnam POW for 7 1/2yrs; wrote book In the Presence of Mine Enemies
Mitch Schauer - television producer and animator, The Angry Beavers.

References
Notes

Sources

External links
Daniel Webster High School

Public high schools in Oklahoma
Educational institutions established in 1938
Art Deco architecture in Oklahoma
Magnet schools in Oklahoma
1938 establishments in Oklahoma
Tulsa Public Schools schools